The Spuyten Duyvil Bridge is a railroad swing bridge that spans the Spuyten Duyvil Creek between Manhattan and the Bronx, in New York City.

The Spuyten Duyvil Bridge was built to carry two tracks but now carries only a single track on the eastern side of the span. It is part of the West Side Line, and is used by Amtrak trains traveling along the Empire Connection. The span is used by approximately 30 trains a day and is opened over 1,000 times per year, primarily during the summer months for Circle Line Sightseeing Cruises and recreational vessels.

History

A wooden railroad drawbridge across the Spuyten Duyvil was first constructed by the New York & Hudson River Railroad in 1849. The railroad continued southward along the West Side Line to St. John's Park Terminal in Lower Manhattan and carried both freight and passenger service. The Hudson River Railroad merged with the New York & Harlem Railroad in 1869, creating the New York Central & Hudson River Railroad, and most trains started bypassing the bridge, instead going to Grand Central Terminal in Midtown Manhattan. An iron bridge replaced the wooden span by 1895.

The current steel bridge was designed by Robert Giles and constructed in 1900. The piers rest on pile foundations in the riverbed. The swing span weighed 200 tons and had enough space to fit two tracks.

By 1935, there were 70 trains a day using the Spuyten Duyvil Bridge, but after World War II, usage declined. In 1963, the steam motor that powered the swing span was replaced with an electric motor. The bridge was slightly damaged three years later, when the swing span was struck by a boat, leaving it stuck in the open position for two weeks. Trains stopped running across the Spuyten Duyvil Bridge in 1982 and the following year the bridge was damaged by a vessel and was left unable to close.

The bridge was rehabilitated in the late 1980s. Amtrak's Empire Service began using the Spuyten Duyvil Bridge on April 7, 1991, following the completion of the Empire Connection. This involved the conversion of the abandoned West Side Line to accommodate passenger service and connect with Pennsylvania Station. Until then, Amtrak trains traveling between New York and Albany had utilized Grand Central Terminal.

During the repairs, trains which had originated in Penn Station and used the bridge originated instead from Grand Central Terminal, bypassing the bridge. The trains returned to their regular routing to Penn Station on September 4.

Incidents
On the evening of February 16, 2004, an 80-year-old woman mistakenly drove her car onto the bridge from the Bronx side of the river and was hit by a Penn Station-bound Amtrak train.  The passenger train carried the automobile for a distance of  along the tracks. She survived with only minor injuries.
During the early morning hours of October 24, 2010, a fire broke out on the bridge, suspending train service until later that evening.
A boat ran into the bridge at around 4:20pm on May 29, 2016, causing major delays on the Empire Corridor, as the bridge was required to be inspected before trains could use it again.  No injuries were reported in the incident.

Gallery

References
Notes

External links

 History of the Spuyten Duyvil Bridge

1899 establishments in New York City
Bridges completed in 1899
Bridges in Manhattan
Bridges in the Bronx
Bridges over the Harlem River
Inwood, Manhattan
New York Central Railroad bridges
Railroad bridges in New York City
Spuyten Duyvil, Bronx
Steel bridges in the United States
Swing bridges in the United States
West Side Line